The 2008 season of the 3. divisjon, the fourth highest association football league for men in Norway.

Between 18 and 26 games (depending on group size) were played in 24 groups, with 3 points given for wins and 1 for draws. Twelve teams were promoted to the 2. divisjon through playoff.

Tables 

Oslo 1
Oslo City – lost playoff
Skeid 2
Årvoll
Grei
Sagene
Bærum 2
Grüner
Jutul
Røa
Lille Tøyen
Fagerborg – relegated
Manglerud Star 2 – relegated

Oslo 2
Ullern – won playoff
Frigg
Hasle-Løren
Nordstrand
Vestli
Asker 2
Kolbotn
Follo 2
Langhus
Kurer
Lommedalen
Heming – relegated

Oslo 3
KFUM – won playoff
Nesodden
Bygdø Monolitten
Grorud
Kjelsås 2
Bøler
Øvrevoll Hosle
Korsvoll 2
Holmen
Vollen
Rommen
Klemetsrud – relegated

Akershus
Høland – lost playoff
Skedsmo
Aurskog/Finstadbru
Funnefoss/Vormsund
Lørenskog 2
Fet
Eidsvold
Ull/Kisa 2
Sørumsand
Fjellhamar
Strømmen 2
Eidsvold Turn 2 – relegated
Bjerke – relegated
Lillestrøm 3 – relegated

Indre Østland 1
FF Lillehammer – won playoff
Brumunddal
Redalen
Moelven
Ringsaker
Toten
Follebu
Hadeland
Raufoss 2
Kolbu/KK
Otta – relegated
Hamar – relegated

Indre Østland 2
Flisa – lost playoff
Ham-Kam 2
Elverum
Sander
Nordre Land
Gjøvik-Lyn (-> Gjøvik FF)
Vardal (-> Gjøvik FF)
Kongsvinger 2
Løten
Fart
Stange – relegated
Østre Trysil – relegated

Buskerud
Åskollen – won playoff
Kongsberg
Konnerud
Birkebeineren
Åssiden
Mjøndalen 2
Svelvik
Jevnaker
Vestfossen
Solberg
Hønefoss BK 2 – relegated
Slemmestad – relegated

Østfold
Kvik/Halden – lost playoff
Mysen
Sarpsborg 2
Lisleby
Askim
Moss 2
Ås
Selbak
Sprint-Jeløy
Rygge
Trøgstad/Båstad
Borgar – relegated
Greåker – relegated
Hærland – relegated

Vestfold
Fram Larvik – won playoff
Larvik Turn
Ørn-Horten
Eik-Tønsberg
FK Tønsberg 2
Sandefjord 2
Tønsberg FK
Sandar
Flint
Falk
Svarstad
Sem – relegated

Telemark
Odd Grenland 2 – lost playoff
Skarphedin
Herkules
Urædd
Ulefoss
Notodden 2
Tollnes
Langesund/Stathelle (-> Stathelle o. Om.)
Brevik
Sannidal
Pors Grenland 2
Skotfoss
Kjapp
Gulset – relegated

Agder
Start 2 – won playoff
Jerv
Trauma
Lyngdal
Søgne
Donn
Birkenes
Giv Akt
Farsund
Vigør
Tveit
Våg
Mandalskameratene 2
FK Arendal – pulled team

Rogaland 1
Klepp – lost playoff
Vidar
Randaberg 2
Sandnes Ulf 2
Staal Jørpeland
Egersund
Vaulen
Frøyland
Buøy
Ålgård 2
Brodd
Sandved
Sola – relegated
Nærbø – relegated

Rogaland 2
Kopervik – won playoff
Skjold
Haugesund 2
Havørn
Avaldsnes
Bryne 2
Åkra
Vedavåg Karmøy
Vardeneset
Nord
Djerv 1919
Austrått
Ganddal – relegated
Vard Haugesund 2 – relegated

Hordaland 1
Brann 2 – lost playoff
Austevoll
Hovding
Vadmyra
Lyngbø
Tertnes
Askøy
Follese
Djerv
Norheimsund
Øygard – relegated
Loddefjord – relegated

Hordaland 2
Stord – won playoff
Voss
Baune
Odda
Hald
Trio
Bergen Nord
Sandviken
Nordhordland
Arna-Bjørnar
Varegg – relegated
Frøya – relegated

Sogn og Fjordane
Førde – lost playoff
Årdal
Sogndal 2
Fjøra
Tornado Måløy
Stryn
Florø
Kaupanger
Høyang
Eid
Skavøypoll – relegated
Selje – relegated

Sunnmøre
Aalesund 2 – lost playoff
Hødd 2
Brattvåg
Volda
Godøy
Hareid
Valder
Langevåg
Rollon
Spjelkavik
Blindheim – relegated
Sykkylven – relegated

Nordmøre og Romsdal
Molde 2 – won playoff
Træff
Elnesvågen/Omegn
Sunndal
Dahle
Surnadal
Eidsvåg
Rival
Kristiansund 2
Averøykameratene
Måndalen
Bryn – relegated

Trøndelag 1
Tiller – lost playoff
Kattem
Kolstad
Ranheim 2
Heimdal
Tynset
Byåsen 2
Melhus
Strindheim 2
Orkla
Nationalkameratene – relegated
Flå – relegated

Trøndelag 2
Nardo – won playoff
Verdal
NTNUI
Namsos
Rosenborg 3
Nidelv
Steinkjer 2
Neset
Vuku
Stjørdals-Blink
Levanger 2 – relegated
Rissa – relegated

Nordland
Bodø/Glimt 2 – won playoff
Stålkameratene
Steigen
Fauske/Sprint
Innstranden
Mosjøen
Tverlandet
Herøy/Dønna
Sandnessjøen
Mo 2 – relegated
Meløy
Bossmo/Ytteren – relegated

Hålogaland
Harstad – lost playoff
Mjølner
Grovfjord
Sortland
Landsås
Skånland
Medkila
Leknes
Hardhaus
Svolvær – relegated

Troms
Skjervøy – lost playoff
Finnsnes
Lyngen/Karnes
Fløya
Tromsdalen 2
Salangen
Ishavsbyen
Nordreisa
Kvaløysletta – relegated
Skognes – relegated
Ramfjord – relegated

Finnmark
Bossekop – won playoff
Porsanger
Alta 2
Hammerfest
Sørøy/Glimt
Kirkenes
Bjørnevatn
Båtsfjord – relegated
Tverrelvdalen
Kautokeino
Norild
Nordlys – relegated

Playoffs

References

Norwegian Third Division seasons
4
Norway
Norway